Robert McCartney was a Scottish footballer who played as a defender. He began and ended his senior career with Leith Athletic, spending his prime years at Heart of Midlothian where he won the Scottish Cup in 1896 and the Scottish Football League championship in 1896–97, playing in all but one of the 18 fixtures; he also claimed two winner's medals each from the minor Rosebery Charity Cup (to add to one from his first spell at Leith) and East of Scotland Shield.

McCartney was selected once for the Scottish League XI in January 1898.

References

Place of birth missing
Year of birth missing
19th-century births
Year of death missing
20th-century deaths
Place of death missing
Scottish footballers
Association football defenders
Heart of Midlothian F.C. players
Leith Athletic F.C. players
Scottish Football League players
Scottish Football League representative players